The Chief Judge of Rivers State, also known as the Chief Judge of the High Court of Justice, is the title and office of the head of the judicial branch of Rivers State. The Chief Judge presides over the state's High Court, and is usually the most senior judge of that court.

As of 2021, Hon. Justice Simeon Chibuzor Amadi is currently the Chief Judge of Rivers State.

Appointment
Appointment to the Office is made by the Governor on the recommendation of the National Judicial Council subject to confirmation of the appointment by the Rivers State House of Assembly.

Duties and responsibilities
The Chief Judge of Rivers State has the responsibility of chairing the Judicial Service Commission as well as coordinating the judicial branch. As the judge with most seniority, the Chief Judge administers the oath of office at the Governor's inauguration and may create rules to regulate the operations of the High Court in the state.

List of Chief Judges

See also
Judiciary of Rivers State
Rivers State Ministry of Justice
Attorney General of Rivers State

References

External links

 
Judiciary of Rivers State
Lists of judges
1970 establishments in Nigeria
1970s establishments in Rivers State
Legal professions